Jan Plaček (5 October 1894 – 18 December 1957) was a Czechoslovak footballer. He competed in the men's tournament at the 1920 Summer Olympics. On a club level, he played for AC Sparta Prague.

References

External links
 

1894 births
1957 deaths
Czech footballers
Czechoslovak footballers
Czechoslovakia international footballers
Olympic footballers of Czechoslovakia
Footballers at the 1920 Summer Olympics
Footballers from Prague
AC Sparta Prague players
Association football forwards